The 2020–21 EBU Player of the Year Championship is the current season of this competition. Points were accumulated over the EBU's nine most prestigious events from 1 October 2020 to 30 September 2021 (the Premier League did not take place due to COVID-19). Boye Brogeland and Espen Erichsen became the second pair to share the title.

List of Competitions

Summary of Results

This list displays the top ten players; 157 players received points. Winners of each event are highlighted in bold. NH indicates Not Held.

References

Contract bridge competitions
Contract bridge in the United Kingdom